2005 Tokyo Verdy 1969 season

Competitions

Domestic results

J. League 1

Emperor's Cup

Tokyo Verdy 1969 received a bye to the fourth round as being part of the J.League Division 1.

J. League Cup

Japanese Super Cup

Tokyo Verdy qualified for this tournament as winners of the 2004 Emperor's Cup

International results

Player statistics

Other pages
 J. League official site

Tokyo Verdy 1969
Tokyo Verdy seasons